Timolin is a village in the south of County Kildare, Ireland. It is a small village, with less than a hundred inhabitants, one shop and two pubs. It is located close to the Moone High Cross Inn. The closest village to Timolin is Moone, less than 1 kilometre to the south.

Public transport
The village is served by bus route 880 operated by Kildare Local Link on behalf of the National Transport Authority. There are several buses each day including Sunday linking the village to Castledermot, Carlow and Naas as well as villages in the area.

History
During the Irish Confederate Wars of the 1640s Timolin was the scene of a notorious massacre. A stronghouse in the village, in which many civilians were sheltering, was attacked by an army under Ormonde. After it had been captured around 200 civilians were killed.

See also
 List of towns and villages in Ireland
 List of abbeys and priories in Ireland (County Kildare)

References 

Towns and villages in County Kildare
Civil parishes of County Kildare